Oberheimbach is an Ortsgemeinde – a municipality belonging to a Verbandsgemeinde, a kind of collective municipality – in the Mainz-Bingen district in Rhineland-Palatinate, Germany.

The inhabitants of this small place are known colloquially as Uhlen.

Geography

Location
Oberheimbach lies between Koblenz and Bad Kreuznach in the valley of the Heimbach. The winegrowing centre belongs to the Verbandsgemeinde of Rhein-Nahe, whose seat is in Bingen am Rhein, although that town is not within its bounds. Since 2003, Oberdiebach has been part of the Rhine Gorge UNESCO World Heritage Site.

History
In 983, Oberheimbach had its first documentary mention.

Politics

The municipal council is made up of 13 council members, counting the part-time mayor, with seats apportioned thus:

(as at municipal election held on 13 June 2004)

Economy and infrastructure

Winegrowing

Oberheimbach is characterized by winegrowing, and with 59 ha of vineyards under cultivation, it is the biggest winegrowing centre on the Middle Rhine after Boppard (64 ha).

Transport
Bundesstraße 9, which links Mainz with Koblenz, lies northeast of the municipality, roughly 2 km away. The Rheinböllen interchange on the Autobahn A 61 lies roughly 15 km away. The nearest railway station is in Niederheimbach on the Mainz-Koblenz line.

References

External links

Municipality’s official webpage 

Mainz-Bingen